A Devil with Women is a 1930 American pre-Code film starring Victor McLaglen, Mona Maris, and Humphrey Bogart, and directed by Irving Cummings.  Set in a Central American country, adventurer McLaglen and sidekick Bogart find themselves in a fierce competition for a luscious young woman's attentions.  Notable for being among Bogart's earliest large film roles.

Cast
Victor McLaglen as Jerry Moxton
Mona Maris as Rosita Fernandez
Humphrey Bogart as Tom Standish
Luana Alcaniz as Dolores
Michael Vavitch as Morloff
Soledad Jiménez as Jiminez
Mona Rico as Alicia
John St. Polo as Don Diego
Robert Edeson as General Garcia
Joe De La Cruz as Juan

References

External links

1930 films
1930 adventure films
American black-and-white films
Films directed by Irving Cummings
Films set in Central America
1930s English-language films
Films with screenplays by Dudley Nichols
Fox Film films
American adventure films
1930s American films